Jorge Martín (born 1998) is a Spanish motorcycle racer.

Jorge Martín may also refer to:
 Jorge Martín (actor) (born 1937), Spanish actor
 Jorge Martín (composer) (born 1959), Cuban-American composer